The Bakery is a 1921 American short comedy film featuring Oliver Hardy that was directed by Larry Semon and Norman Taurog.

Cast
 Larry Semon as Larry, a Bakery Clerk
 Oliver Hardy as Foreman (credited as Babe Hardy)
 Frank Alexander as Bakery Owner
 Norma Nichols as Bakery Owner's Daughter
 William Hauber as Rival worker (credited as Bill Hauber)
 Grover Ligon as Bakery worker
 Eva Thatcher as Customer
 Pete Gordon as Bakery worker
 Al Thompson as Bakery Worker
 Jack Duffy as Elderly Shop Owner(uncredited)

See also
 List of American films of 1921
 Oliver Hardy filmography

References

External links

1921 films
1921 short films
1921 comedy films
American silent short films
American black-and-white films
Silent American comedy films
Films directed by Larry Semon
American comedy short films
1920s American films